This is a timeline of ISIL-related events that occurred in the year 2020.

Timeline

January 

 On 9 January in a gunfight at a Niger military base, 89 Niger Armed Forces soldiers and 77 ISIL militants killed during the battle.

February 

 On 2 February, two people were stabbed in Streatham, London, and one more had minor injuries. The perpetrator, Sudesh Amman, who was a fighter of Islamic State and had previously praised it, was shot dead by police.
 On 9 February an individual conducted a vehicle-borne improvised explosive device (VBIED) suicide attack targeting a military outpost in southern Algeria, near the border with Mali, killing himself and one Algerian soldier.

March 

 On 6 March, ISIL gunmen killed 32 people and injured over 80 people at a ceremony in Kabul, Afghanistan.
 On 25 March, ISIL killed 25 people in a gurdwara in Kabul, Afghanistan.

April 

 On April 27, a French man who pledged allegiance to ISIS intentionally rammed his car into two police officials, gravely injuring both, near Paris.

May 

 On 12 May, gunmen executed a mass shooting at a hospital's maternity ward. 80 patients were evacuated, 24 victims, including newborn babies, mothers, and nurses, killed by the gunmen and all three attackers killed by the army; An hour after the Kabul attack, a suicide bombing took place in Kuz Kunar, Nangarhar Province at the funeral of a police commander, killing 32 mourners and injuring 133 others.

August 

 On August 3, the ISIL launched an attack on an Afghan prison that left at least 29 dead.
 On August 6, ISIS-SP attacked an EAF checkpoint with small arms resulting in the deaths of 15 EAF soldiers near Wasit in South Sinai, Egypt.
 On August 21, militants led by ISIS-affiliated terrorist Khaled al-Talawi killed two police officers and one civilian in the town of Kaftoun in northern Lebanon. The LAF apprehended and killed al-Talawi on September 13 near Tripoli. As a result, four LAF soldiers were killed during the operation.

November 

 Between November 2–3, five were killed in Stadttempel, Vienna, including the perpetrator. The Vienna Police Department confirmed that the attacker was an Islamic State sympathizer, and that the attack was motivated by Islamic extremism.

December 

 On 30 December, an assault targeted a convoy of Syrian regime soldiers and militiamen of Bashar al-Assad's elite Fourth Brigade returning from their posts in Deir Ez-Zor. The bus was ambushed in a well-planned operation near the village of Shula by jihadists who set up a false checkpoint to stop the convoy and detonated bombs before opening fire.

References 

Timelines of ISIL-related events
2020 in Lebanon
2020 in Syria
2020 in Iraq
2022 in military history
Lists of armed conflicts in 2020
Islamic terrorist incidents in 2020
2020-related lists
2020 in Afghanistan
Islamic State of Iraq and the Levant activities
Terrorism-related lists